Ferdinand Hueter (31 January 1960 – 13 February 2022) was an Austrian politician. He died on 13 February 2022, at the age of 62.

References

1960 births
2022 deaths
Austrian People's Party politicians
21st-century Austrian politicians
People from Carinthia (state)